Notre étoile (English: Our star) is the debut and only studio album of the French boy band Linkup made of  Lionel Tim, Otis and Matthieu Tota (later on known as M. Pokora). It was released in 2003 on Universal Licensing Music (ULM) in France after it was created during the third season of the popular French reality show "Popstars", called "Popstars - the Duel" aired on RTL Group TV channel M6.

Track list

Credits
Adapted by A. Essertier (tracks: 1, 2, 6, 7, 11), F. Welgryn (tracks: 1, 2, 6, 7, 9, 11, 12), Jimmy Bitton (tracks: 4), Laurent Lescarret (tracks: 3, 8), Maïdi Roth (tracks: 5)
Graphic artwork by – Happydesign
Backing Vocals [Choir] – Guillaume Eyango (tracks: 2, 3, 5, 10 to 12), J.Marie Marrier (tracks: 1, 6, 7, 9)
Bass – Rémy Léger (tracks: 1, 3 to 12)
Brass – Christian Fourquet (tracks: 3, 8), Eric Mula (tracks: 3, 8), Vincent Chavagnac (tracks: 3, 8)
Drums – Jost Nickel (tracks: 1, 3, 4, 6, 8, 9, 12), Yves Sanna (tracks: 7, 10)
Edited by – C. Lieu (tracks: 1 to 8, 10 to 12), T. Vercruysse (tracks: 3, 11)
Sound engineer – Steve Forward
Executive Producer – Alain Yahmi, G. Baurez, L. Maurel
Guitar – A. Aubaille (tracks: 12), B. Commére (tracks: 7), P. Falcao, S. Forward (tracks: 4)
Keyboards – N. Neidhardt (tracks: 4, 10)
Strings – Simon Hale (tracks: 1, 3, 6, 9, 10)
Piano – A. Aubaille (tracks: 1), Guillaume Eyango (tracks: 8), N. Neidhardt (tracks: 6, 9)
Mastered by – Miles Showell
Mixed by – Christian Lieu (tracks: 11, 12), Nicolas Garin (tracks: 9), Steve Forward (tracks: 1 to 8, 10)
String Orchestration – London Session Orchestra
Production Coordinator – Stéphanie Marquer
Photography By – Vincent Soyez
Producer – A. Aubaille (tracks: 2, 5, 8, 12), N. Neidhardt (tracks: 1, 2, 5 to 8, 12), Nicolas Neidhardt (tracks: 3, 4, 9 to 11), P. Falcao (tracks: 1, 6, 7)
Pre-production Producer – A. Aubaille (tracks: 2, 5, 8, 12), B. Commére (tracks: 4, 7, 10, 11), N. Neidhardt (tracks: 3, 9), P. Falcao (tracks: 1, 6), R. Léger* (tracks: 4, 7, 10, 11)
Programmed by – Arnaud Aubaille (tracks: 2, 5, 7, 8, 11, 12), A. Aubaille (tracks: 4), B. Commére (tracks: 4, 10), N. Neidhardt* (tracks: 3, 9, 10), P. Falcao (tracks: 1, 6), R. Léger (tracks: 4, 10)
Additional Programming by – C. Lieu (tracks: 2, 4, 12), N. Neidhardt (tracks: 4)
Additional Recording by – T. Vercruysse

2003 debut albums
Linkup albums